Branešci is a village in the municipality of Čajetina, western Serbia. According to the 2011 census, the village has a population of 737 people.

References

Populated places in Zlatibor District
Open-air museums in Serbia